Ribonucleases P/MRP protein subunit POP1 is a protein that in humans is encoded by the POP1 gene.

Function 

POP1 is a protein subunit of two different small nucleolar ribonucleoprotein complexes: the endoribonuclease for mitochondrial RNA processing complex and the ribonuclease P complex. This protein is a ribonuclease that localizes to the nucleus and functions in pre-RNA processing.

Clinical significance 

POP1 is also an autoantigen in patients with connective tissue diseases. Mutations in the POP1 gene result in severe anauxetic dysplasia.

Interactions 

POP1 (gene) has been shown to interact with POP4.

References

Further reading